Hell on Stage is the tenth album by heavy metal band Manowar, recorded live on the Hell on Stage world tour in 1998.

Track listing

Disc 1 

 "Metal Daze" (Battle Hymns)
 "Dark Avenger" (Battle Hymns)
 "March for Revenge (By the Soldiers of Death)" (Into Glory Ride)
 "Hatred" (Into Glory Ride)
 "Gates of Valhalla" (Into Glory Ride)
 "Bridge of Death" (Hail to England)
 "William's Tale" (Battle Hymns)
 "Guyana (Cult of the Damned)" (Sign of the Hammer)

Disc 2
 "The Warrior's Prayer" (Kings of Metal)
 "Blood of the Kings" (Kings of Metal)
 "Sting of the Bumblebee" (Kings of Metal)
 "Heart of Steel" (Kings of Metal)
 "Master of the Wind" (The Triumph of Steel)
 "Outlaw" (Louder Than Hell)
 "The Power" (Louder Than Hell)
 "The Crown and the Ring" (Kings of Metal)

When the album was first sold in some European countries, it was packaged with an extra CD EP which contained songs recorded live in those countries.

French Edition Bonus CD

German Edition Bonus CD

Portuguese Edition Bonus CD

Spanish Edition Bonus CD

Charts

References 

Manowar albums
1999 live albums